The Philadelphia Flyers are a professional ice hockey team based in Philadelphia, Pennsylvania. They are members of the Metropolitan Division of the National Hockey League's (NHL) Eastern Conference. The Flyers were founded in 1967 as one of six expansion teams, increasing the size of the NHL at that time to 12 teams.

Since the franchise was established, the team has had 19 captains, including Bobby Clarke, who captained the Flyers to two Stanley Cups in 1973–74 and 1974–75, and is the only player to have scored over 1,000 points for the Flyers. Clarke was awarded the Hart Memorial Trophy as the NHL's most valuable player three times, and was inducted into the Hockey Hall of Fame in 1987. Twelve other players who have appeared for the Flyers have been inducted into the Hockey Hall of Fame: Bobby Clarke, Bill Barber, Paul Coffey, Peter Forsberg, Dale Hawerchuk, Mark Howe, Eric Lindros, Adam Oates, Bernie Parent, Chris Pronger, Mark Recchi, Darryl Sittler and Allan Stanley. Six players have been honored by having their number retired by the Flyers: Barber, Clarke, Howe, Lindros, Parent and Barry Ashbee. Twenty-seven people have been inducted into the Flyers Hall of Fame since its establishment in 1988, of which twenty-two have been players.

In addition to leading the team in points both in the regular season and playoffs, Clarke also holds the records for the most appearances and most assists for the Flyers in both regular season and playoffs. Fellow Stanley Cup winner Barber has scored the most goals for the team with his 420 regular season and 53 playoff goals. Rick Tocchet spent the most time in the penalty box during the regular season for the Flyers, accruing 1,817 minutes in total, while Dave Schultz's 363 penalty minutes are the most by a Flyer in the playoffs. Among goaltenders, Roman Cechmanek boasts the best goals against average and save percentage in the regular season (excluding Marc D'Amour and Robbie Moore, neither of whom made more than five appearances).

As of the completion of the 2021–22 NHL season, 62 goaltenders and 603 skaters (forwards and defensemen) have appeared in at least one regular season and/or playoff game with the Philadelphia Flyers since the team joined the league in the 1967–68 NHL season. The Flyers won the Stanley Cup in 1974 and 1975 with a total of 26 players. Seventeen of them were part of both Stanley Cup winning rosters. The 665 all-time members of the Flyers are listed below, with statistics complete through the end of the 2021–22 season.

Key
 Won a Stanley Cup with the Flyers
 Appeared in a Flyers game during the most recently completed season

Statistics are complete to the end of the 2021–22 NHL season.

Goaltenders

Goaltenders who played for the team

Skaters

Skaters who played for the team in previous seasons

Skaters who played for the team during the most recently completed season

Notes

References

General
 
 
 
 
Specific

Philadelphia Flyers
 
players